The 2020 Low6 Home Tour Play-Offs was a special tournament organised by the Professional Darts Corporation for players to play indoor tournaments at their homes during the COVID-19 pandemic.

It began on 17 April 2020 with the 2020 PDC Home Tour, with the Play-Offs commencing on 26 May 2020, and ended on 5 June 2020. The tournament was open to all players who had a PDC Tour Card in 2020.

The winner was Nathan Aspinall, who won the final Championship Group finishing ahead of Gary Anderson, Jonny Clayton and Jelle Klaasen.
Therefore Aspinall was awarded with a place in the 2020 Grand Slam of Darts.

Format

In the play-offs phase taking place between 26 May and 2 June, the 32 winners will again be put into groups of four, where all players will play each other over one night, but each match is now a best of 11 legs match, but all other rules being the same. The eight winners in the second phase will then move into a semi-final group stage taking place on 3 & 4 June, with the top two in each group moving forward to the Championship Group stage, where the winner will become the champion.

Each match will be a best of 11 legs match, with the winner of each match getting two points on the table. Should there be a tie on points after all the matches, the leg difference will determine the winner, should that also be equal, the result between the two players is taken into account. Should there be a three-way tie for first place, the overall average of the players will then be taken into account.

Play-Off Groups
All matches first to 6 (best-of-11 legs)

NB: P = Played; W = Won; L = Lost; LF = Legs for; LA = Legs against; +/− = Plus/minus record, in relation to legs; Avg = Three-dart average in group matches; Pts = Group points

Play-Off Qualifiers
All 32 2020 PDC Home Tour winners are put into a pool based on their PDC Order of Merit ranking. The groups they were put in were pre-determined by their PDC Order of Merit ranking.

Group 1 – 26 May

Group 2 – 27 May

Group 3 – 28 May

Group 4 – 29 May

Group 5 – 30 May

Group 6 – 31 May

Group 7 – 1 June

Group 8 – 2 June

Semi-final groups
The semi-final groups consisted of the eight winners from the Last 32 stages, with the winners of Groups 1–4 in semi-final Group 1 and the winners of Groups 5–8 in semi-final Group 2.

All matches first to 6 (best-of-11 legs)

NB: P = Played; W = Won; L = Lost; LF = Legs for; LA = Legs against; +/− = Plus/minus record, in relation to legs; Avg = Three-dart average in group matches; Pts = Group points

Group 1 – 3 June

Group 2 – 4 June

Championship Group – 5 June
The Championship Group consisted of the top 2 players from the 2 semi-final groups.

All matches first to 6 (best-of-11 legs)

NB: P = Played; W = Won; L = Lost; LF = Legs for; LA = Legs against; +/− = Plus/minus record, in relation to legs; Avg = Three-dart average in group matches; Pts = Group points

References

Professional Darts Corporation tournaments
2020 in darts
PDC Home Tour